"Goniąc za cieniem" is second single for Ewelina Flinta from her debut album Przeznaczenie. This song was written by  A. Todd and T. Laurer, but the Polish lyrics were authored by E. Warszawska. The song appears in the compilation albums Radio Zet: Tylko Wielkie Przeboje, Polskie Przeboje Jedynki vol.5, and Poplista RMF FM.

2003 singles
Ewelina Flinta songs